Sonico may refer to:

Sonico, Lombardy, a comune in the province of Brescia, Lombardy, Italy
Sonico.com, a social networking service
Super Sonico, a mascot of the Japanese software company Nitroplus